John Victor Nicholas is an Australian judge. He has been a judge of the Federal Court of Australia since November 2009. Prior to his appointment, Nicholas practised as a senior counsel in Sydney, principally in commercial law.

Biography
Nicholas graduated from the University of New South Wales with bachelor's degrees in laws and arts.

Nicholas was admitted as a solicitor in 1982 and as a barrister in 1987, becoming senior counsel in 2001.

See also 

 Biological patent

See also
List of Judges of the Federal Court of Australia

References

Living people
Judges of the Federal Court of Australia
Australian Senior Counsel
University of New South Wales Law School alumni
Year of birth missing (living people)